Arundel is a town in York County, Maine, United States. At the 2020 census, the population was 4,264. It is part of the Portland–South Portland–Biddeford, Maine Metropolitan Statistical Area. The Municipality of Arundel includes the constituent communities and neighbourhoods of: Arundel Village, Vinegar Hill, Riverside Arundel, Log Cabin Crossing, Goff Mill, Millers Crossing, and Cottagehill (Cape Arundel Cottage Preserve), among other neighbourhoods in an inland area adjacent to the Towns of Kennebunkport and Biddeford. In 2014, Arundel was named “Best Place to Live in Maine” by Downeast Magazine.

History

The area now known as Arundel, while sometimes referred to by that name, was a part of Kennebunkport until 1915, at which point it was set off and named North Kennebunkport. In 1957, following the publication of the Chronicles of Arundel by Kenneth Roberts, the town was renamed Arundel by the state legislature, after Lord Arundel. Previously, Kennebunkport was called Arundel from 1701 to 1821 when it got its present name. The name Arundel came from the town of Arundel in West Sussex.

Geography

Arundel is drained by the Kennebunk River.

The town is crossed by Interstate 95, U.S. Route 1 and state routes 35 and 111. It is bordered by the towns of Kennebunkport to the southeast, Kennebunk to the southwest, Lyman to the northwest, Dayton to the north, and Biddeford to the northeast.

Demographics

2010 census

As of the census of 2010, there were 4,022 people, 1,569 households, and 1,109 families living in the town. The racial makeup of the town was 96.6% White, 0.4% African American, 0.5% Native American, 0.8% Asian, 0.2% from other races, and 1.5% from two or more races. Hispanic or Latino of any race were 1.0% of the population.

There were 1,569 households, of which 31.5% had children under the age of 18 living with them, 57.2% were married couples living together, 8.7% had a female householder with no husband present, 4.8% had a male householder with no wife present, and 29.3% were non-families. 20.8% of all households were made up of individuals, and 7.4% had someone living alone who was 65 years of age or older. The average household size was 2.56 and the average family size was 2.96.

The median age in the town was 42.9 years. 22% of residents were under the age of 18; 6.7% were between the ages of 18 and 24; 24.6% were from 25 to 44; 34.7% were from 45 to 64; and 12.2% were 65 years of age or older. The gender makeup of the town was 49.2% male and 50.8% female.

2000 census

As of the census of 2000, there were 3,571 people, 1,363 households, and 999 families living in the town. The racial makeup of the town was 98.26% White, 0.14% African American, 0.45% Native American, 0.39% Asian, 0.06% Pacific Islander, 0.14% from other races, and 0.56% from two or more races. Hispanic or Latino of any race were 0.50% of the population.

There were 1,363 households, out of which 35.6% had children under the age of 18 living with them, 61.3% were married couples living together, 8.5% had a female householder with no husband present, and 26.7% were non-families. 19.4% of all households were made up of individuals, and 5.9% had someone living alone who was 65 years of age or older. The average household size was 2.61 and the average family size was 3.01.

In the town, 26.1% of the residential population is under the age of 18, 6.2% is from 18 to 24, 32.5% from 25 to 44, 27.1% from 45 to 64, and 8.1% were 65 years of age or older. The median age was 37 years. For every 100 females, there were 97.5 males. For every 100 females age 18 and over, there were 97.0 males.

The median income for a household in the town was $49,484, and the median income for a family was $50,709. Males had a median income of $35,517 versus $25,684 for females. The per capita income for the town was $20,538. About 5.0% of families and 5.4% of the population were below the poverty line, including 9.6% of those under age 18 and 4.5% of those age 65 or over.

Education
Arundel is part of the RSU21 school district which encompasses the Towns of Arundel, Kennebunk, and Kennebunkport.  Prior to being included in the RSU21, students from the Town of Arundel were given the option to attend Thornton Academy (9–12 grade), starting with Thornton Academy Middle School (6–8 grade) when it was built, with tuition being covered by the Town of Arundel. RSU21 fought this school choice option and resulting in a 3 year court battle. The effort to suppress school choice was ended. The option  to attend Thornton Academy schools is still being preserved as of the ruling by the Maine Supreme Judicial Court on July 18, 2019.

Mildred L. Day School is the elementary school for the children of Arundel from the grades kindergarten to fifth grade.

Adjacent towns

 Biddeford
 Dayton
 Kennebunk
 Kennebunkport
 Lyman

References

External links
 Town of Arundel, Maine
 Arundel at Maine.gov
 Arundel Elementary School
 Epodunk Town Profile
 History of Kennebunkport & Arundel, Maine (1886)

 
Populated places established in 1915
Towns in York County, Maine
Portland metropolitan area, Maine
Towns in Maine